Kyle Exume (born November 22, 1987, in Brooklin, Ontario) is a professional Canadian football running back who was most recently a member of the Edmonton Eskimos. He most previously played for the Hamilton Tiger-Cats of the Canadian Football League. He was drafted 40th overall by the Saskatchewan Roughriders in the 2011 CFL Draft, but was released after training camp. He subsequently signed with the Tiger-Cats on June 27, 2011. He played CIS football for the Bishop's Gaiters.

References

1987 births
Living people
Bishop's Gaiters football players
Canadian football defensive backs
Edmonton Elks players
Hamilton Tiger-Cats players
Sportspeople from Whitby, Ontario
Players of Canadian football from Ontario
Saskatchewan Roughriders players